Edward Arthur James Stallard (September 1892 – 30 October 1917) was an English professional footballer who played as a centre forward in the Southern Football League for West Ham United.

Personal life
Stallard served as a private in the London Regiment during the First World War. He was killed in action on 30 November 1917 during the Battle of Cambrai and is commemorated on the Cambrai Memorial to the Missing.

Career statistics

References

1892 births
Military personnel from London
Date of birth missing
1917 deaths
Footballers from Hackney, London
Association football forwards
English footballers
Southern Football League players
Chatham Town F.C. players
West Ham United F.C. players
British Army personnel of World War I
London Scottish soldiers
British military personnel killed in World War I